Adyghe is a polysynthetic language with an ergative verb-final clause structure and rich verb morphology.

Ergative–absolutive

Adyghe is an ergative-absolutive language, unlike nominative-accusative languages, such as English, where the single argument of an intransitive verb ("She" in the sentence "She walks.") behaves grammatically like the agent of a transitive verb ("She" in the sentence "She finds it."), in ergative-absolutive language, the subject of an intransitive verb behaves like the object of a transitive verb, and differently from the agent of a transitive verb. For example, the word кӏалэ "boy" in the intransitive sentence кӏалэр малӏэ "the boy dies" behaves grammatically different from the word кӏалэ "boy" in the transitive sentence кӏалэм ар еукӏы "the boy kills it".

Nouns in Adyghe can have the following roles in a sentence:
Ergative case: Marked as -м /-m/, it serves to mark the one that causes change by doing the verb.
Absolutive case: Marked as -р /-r/, it serves to mark the one that is changed by the verb's, i.e. it is being created, altered, moved or ended by the verb.
Oblique case: Also marked as -м /-m/, it serves to mark the dative and applicative case roles. It acts as the indirect object in the sentence and its state is not changed by the verb, i.e. we have no indication of what happens to it or how it behaves after the verb.

In intransitive verbs the subject is in the absolutive case thus it indicates that the subject is changing (
created, altered, moved or ended).

In this example the boy is changing by moving:

In this example the man is changing by moving. The verb еон /jawan/ "to hit" describes the movement of hitting  and not the impact itself, so we have no indication of what happens to the object (the wall in this case).

In transitive verbs the subject is in the ergative case thus it indicates that the subject causes change to the object which gets the absolutive case.

In this example the wall changes by being destroyed (it was altered). The verb къутэн /qʷətan/ "to destroy" does not indicate how the subject (boy) destroyed the wall thus we have no indication of the boy changing, making him the one that caused the change (and not the one that changes).

In this example the rock changes by moving (motion in air), the man causes the change and the wall acts as the indirect object of the preposition.

It is important to distinguish between the intransitive and transitive verb, because the subject and object noun cases as well as the sentences' verb conjunctions (the prefixes that indicate person) depend on it. A fault in this can change the meaning of the sentence drastically, switching the roles of the subject and object. For instance, look at the following two sentences:

Even though the noun cases of the word boy кӏалэ are the same (In the Ergative-Oblique case marked as -м), they behave grammatically different because the verb еплъын "to look" is considered an intransitive verb in contrast to the verb елъэгъун "to see" which is transitive.

Noun

Singular and plural

A Circassian noun can be in one of the following two states: singular or plural

Singular nouns have zero morpheme (no prefixes / suffixes), while plural nouns use the additional хэ morpheme, which is attached to the main form of the word. For example: singular: унэ "home", тхылъ "book", plural: унэ-хэ-р "homes", тхылъ-хэ-р "books".

Unlike English verbs, Circassian verbs use -х- or -а- morphemes to form their plural versions. The second morpheme is attached to the verb in front of the verb's root, and the first is attached after it. For example: ар макӏо "he is going", ахэр макӏо-х "they are going"; ащ ыӏуагъ "he said", ахэмэ а-ӏуагъ "they said".

Definite and indefinite forms
Circassian nouns usually have either definite or indefinite form. The idea behind this concept is close to the idea of definite/indefinite articles in English. The definite form of Circassian nouns have -р or -м 
(noun cases) formats at the end of the word. For example: кӏалэ "boy" – indefinite noun, i.e. an undefined boy—this form of the word is used in generalizations or when the boy is unknown to either the speaker or listener (a/an or zero article in English)— кӏалэр, кӏалэм "the boy" – these forms are used when the mentioned boy is well known to both the speaker and listener.

Cases
Adyghe has four different noun cases, each with corresponding suffixes: absolutive, ergative, instrumental, and adverbial.

Absolutive case
The absolutive case of a definite noun is marked by the affix -р  both in the singular and plural forms (e.g. кӏалэр  'the boy', кӏалэхэр  ('the boys'), шыр  'the horse'). The absolutive case usually expresses subject in conjunction with intransitive verbs or direct object in conjunction with transitive verbs: For example:

In the following example, Кӏалэр is in the absolutive case, it points to the subject (the boy), and the sentence is in the absolutive form with an intransitive verb (кӏуагъэ);

In the following example, джанэр is in the absolutive case, it points to the direct object (the shirt which is being laundered), and the sentence is in the ergative form (after the form of its subject – Бзылъфыгъэм) with a transitive verb (егыкӏы).

Ergative-Oblique case
A noun in the ergative case is marked by the affix -м  (e.g. кӏалэм  'the boy's', кӏалэхэм  'the boys'', шым  'the horse). This case has two roles: Ergative role and Oblique role.

The Ergative role functions as subject in conjunction with transitive verbs.

The Oblique role functions as indirect object with both transitive and intransitive verbs. 

An example with an intransitive verb еджэ "reads" and indirect object тхылъым "book".

An example with an transitive verb реты "gives" and indirect object пшъашъэм "girl".

The Ergative-Oblique case can also be used as an adverbial modifier. For example: Студентхэм мафэм ӏоф ашӏагъ "The students have worked during the day" (мафэм – adverbial modifier of time); Кӏалэхэр мэзым кӏуагъэх "The boys went to the forest" (мэзым – adverbial modifier of place).

Instrumental case
Indefinite nouns are marked by the suffix -кӏэ : тхылъ-кӏэ, "by/with a book", ӏэ-кӏэ "by/with a hand". Definite nouns express this case using the ergative suffix -м in conjunction with the affix -кӏэ: уатэ-м-кӏэ "by/with the hammer", тхылъы-м-кӏэ "by/with the book". The instrumental case expresses instruments (tools or means), directions or purposes of action.

In the following example, the instrumental case is used to indicate a instrument (tool):

In the following example, the instrumental case is used to indicate a purpose of action:

In the following example, the instrumental case is used to indicate a direction:

Adverbial case
Has the suffix -эу  (e.g. кӏалэу   'boy'), шэу  'horse'). The adverbial case usually expresses a transition into something, or defines the subject/object of a verb. It points to the real (literal, not grammatical) subject in the sentence. For example:

Derivation
Сomposition and suffixation are the most typical ways to form Circassian nouns. There are different ways of composing words, for example: мэзчэ́т (мэз "forest", чэт "chicken", pheasant), псычэ́т (псы "water", чэт "chicken", duck), мэкъумэ́щ "agriculture" (мэкъу "hay", мэщы́ "millet"), шхапӏэ "cafeteria" (шхэн "eat", пӏэ "place").

The following suffixes are used to form Circassian nouns:

Possessive
Possessive cases are one of the most important grammatical characteristics of nouns in the Circassian language. There are two (in some versions of the Circassian grammar there is third form, called "cognate", which is somewhere between the two mentioned below) main forms of possessive cases:

 organic
 proprietary

Inalienable possession

Inalienable nouns include body parts (such as leg, which is necessarily "someone's leg" even if it is severed from the body), kinship terms (such as mother), name, and part-whole relations (such as top). Singular Circassian inalienable nouns are expressed by the following prefixes:

Plural nouns have these prefixes:

Alienable possession

Alienable possession is used when referring to property, objects, concepts, ideas and attributes. Singular Circassian nouns of the proprietary form are expressed by the following prefixes:

Plural nouns have these prefixes:

Pronouns

In the Circassian language pronouns belong to the following groups: personal, demonstrative, possessive, interrogative, adherent, indefinite.

Personal pronouns are only expressed in first and second person in singular and plural forms: сэ /sa/ "I", тэ /ta/ "we" о /wa/ "you" and шъо /ʃʷa/ "you" (plural).

In order to express third person, the special demonstrative pronouns ар "he", мор "that", мыр "this", ахэр, мыхэр "they, that" are used. For Circassian personal pronouns there is no contrast between the absolutive and ergative grammatical cases (like it is with Circassian nouns). These two grammatical cases merge into one common case, so personal pronouns have only three different cases: absolutive-ergative, instrumental and  adverbial.

Grammatical cases of personal pronouns:

In a sentence a personal pronoun usually plays role of subject or object:

Сэ седжэ "I read (study)";
О уеджэ тхылъым "You are reading the book";
Тэ тэкӏо еджапӏэм "We are going to school";
Шъо ӏоф шъошӏэ "You (plural) are working";
Сэркӏэ мы ӏофы́р къины "This job is hard for me".

Demonstrative pronouns are мы "this", мо "that", а "that". There is a contradistinction between "мы" and "мо" on how far the referred object is. The pronoun "а" is neutral on this matter.

Мы унэм нахьи мо унакӏэу къашӏырэр нахь дах "This house, which is being built, is more beautiful than that one";
А тхылъэ́у пщэфыгъэм сегъэплъыба "Show me the book you have bought, please".

Demonstrative pronouns switch four grammatical cases:

Absolutive мыр, мор, ар;
Ergative мыщ, мощ, ащ;
Instrumental мыщкӏэ, мощкӏэ, ащкӏэ;
Adverbial мырэу, морэу, арэу.

The plural form of demonstrative pronouns is expressed by the -хэ- formant:

Absolutive мыхэр,
Ergative мыхэм,
Instrumental мыхэмкӏэ,
Adverbial мыхэу.

Possessive pronouns express the idea that something belongs to someone. There are several possessive pronouns in the Circassian language:

сэсый "my/mine",
оуий "your/yours",
ий "his",
тэтый "our/ours",
шъошъуй "your/yours" (plural),
яй "their/theirs".

These pronouns change their form in different grammatical cases in the same way. Let us show examples of how they are used in a sentence:

Мы унэр сэсый "This house is mine";
Мы чъыгхэр тэтыех "These trees are ours".

The following pronouns are interrogative pronouns of the Circassian language:

хэт (хэта)? "who?",
сыд (сыда)? "what?",
тхьапш? "how much (many)?",
тары? "which?",
сыдигъу? "when?",
тыдэ? "where?",
сыд фэд? "what kind of?".

The interrogative pronoun хэт? "who?" is used to address the nouns that belong to the class of human being, and the pronoun сыд? "what?" is for the nouns that belong to the class of thing. For example:

Хэт зыӏуагъэр? "Who has said (that)?",
Хэт унэм къихьагъэр? "Who has entered the house?",
Сыд плъэгъугъа? -Хьэ слъэгъугъэ. "What have you seen? – I've seen a dog".
Сыд къэпхьыгъэр? – "What have you brought?", Пхъэ къэсхьыгъэр – "I have brought firewood".

Circassian adherent pronouns:

ежь "self",
зэкӏэ "all",
шъхьадж "every",
ышъхьэкӏэ "self personally",
хэти, хэтрэ́ "everyone", "each",
сыди, сыдрэ́ "everything", "each", "any" and some others.

Examples:

Хэти зышъхьамысыжьэу ӏоф ышӏэн фае "Everyone must work without pitying himself";
Сыдрэ ӏофри дэгъу, угу къыбдеӏэу бгъэцакӏэмэ "Any job is good if done with full heart".

There is only one pronoun in the Circassian language which belongs to the group of indefinite pronouns. This pronoun is зыгорэ́. It has several close meanings: "someone", "one", "something", "somebody" and so on. The indefinite pronoun has the same forms in different grammatical cases like nouns have:

Here are examples of how these forms are used in a sentence:

Зыгорэ пчъэм къытеуагъ "Someone has knocked the door";
А тхылъ гъэшӏэгъоным зыгорэ къытегущыӏэгъагъ "Somebody has spoken about this interesting book".

Verbs

In Adyghe, like all Northwest Caucasian languages, the verb is the most inflected part of speech. Verbs are typically head final and are conjugated for tense, person, number, etc. Some of Circassian verbs can be morphologically simple, some of them consist only of one morpheme, like: кӏо "go", штэ "take". However, generally, Circassian verbs are characterized as structurally and semantically difficult entities. Morphological structure of a Circassian verb includes affixes (prefixes, suffixes) which are specific to the language. Verbs' affixes express meaning of subject, direct or indirect object, adverbial, singular or plural form, negative form, mood, direction, mutuality, compatibility and reflexivity, which, as a result, creates a complex verb, that consists of many morphemes and semantically expresses a sentence. For example: уакъыдэсэгъэгущыӏэжьы "I am forcing you to talk to them again" consists of the following morphemes: у-а-къы-дэ-сэ-гъэ-гущыӏэ-жьы, with the following meanings: "you (у) with them (а)  from there (къы) together (дэ) I (сэ) am forcing (гъэ) to speak (гущыӏэн) again (жьы)".

Transitivity
Verbs in Adyghe can be transitive or intransitive.

In a sentence with a transitive verb, nouns in the absolutive case (marked as -р) play the role of direct object. In the sentences of this type the noun in the subject's position is in the ergative case (marked as -м):

Кӏалэм письмэр етхы "The boy is writing the letter";
Пхъашӏэм уатэр къыштагъ "The carpenter took the hammer";
Хьэм тхьакӏумкӏыхьэр къыубытыгъ "The dog has caught the rabbit".

In these sentences the verbs етхы "is writing", къыштагъ "took", къыубытыгъ "has caught" are transitive verbs, and the nouns письмэр "letter", уатэр "hammer", тхьакӏумкӏыхьэр "rabbit" are in the absolutive case (suffix -р) and express direct object in the sentences, while the nouns кӏалэм "boy", пхъашӏэм "carpenter", хьэм "dog" are subjects expressed in the ergative case.

In a sentence with an intransitive verb, there is no direct object, and the real subject is usually expressed by a noun in the absolutive case

Чэмахъор щыт "The cowherd is standing (there)";
Пэсакӏор макӏо "The security guard is going";
Лӏыр мэчъые "The man is sleeping".

In these sentences with intransitive verbs, nouns that the play role of subject are expressed in the absolutive case: чэмахъо-р "cowherd", пэсакӏо-р "guard", лӏы-р "man".

There are verbs in the Adygeh language that in different contexts and situations can be used both as transitive and intransitive. For example:

Апчыр мэкъутэ "The glass is being broken",
Кӏалэм апчыр екъутэ "The boy is breaking the glass".

In the first sentence the verb мэкъутэ "is being broken" is used as an intransitive verb that creates an absolutive construction. In the second sentence the verb е-къутэ "is breaking" creates an ergative construction. Both of the verbs are formed from the verb къутэ-н "to break".

In the Adyghe language, intransitive verbs can have indirect objects in a sentence. The indirect objects are expressed by a noun in the oblique case (which is also marked as -м). For example:

Кӏалэр пшъашъэм ебэу "The boy kisses the girl",
Лӏыр чъыгым чӏэлъ "The man lays under the tree".
Кӏалэр тхылъым еджэ "The boy reads the book".

In these sentences with intransitive verbs, nouns that play the role of indirect object are expressed in the oblique case: пшъашъэ-м  "girl", чъыгы-м "tree", тхылъы-м "book".

Intransitive verbs can be turned into transitive with the causative prefix гъэ- (meaning "to force, to make"). For example:

Ар мачъэ "He is running", but Ащ ар е-гъа-чъэ "He forces him to run",
Ар мэкуо "He is screaming", but Ащ ар е-гъэ-куо "He makes him scream".

The verbs in the first sentences мачъэ "is running", мэкуо "is screaming" are intransitive, and the verbs in the second sentences егъачъэ "forces ... to run", егъэкуо "makes ... scream" are already transitive.

Dynamic and static verbs
Adyghe verbs can be either dynamic or static.

Dynamic verbs express (process of) actions that are taking place (natural role of verbs in English):

Сэ сэчъэ "I am running";
Сэ сэцӏэнлъэ "I am crawling",
Сэ сэлъэгъу "I am seeing",
Сэ сэӏо "I am saying".

Static verbs express states or results of actions:

Сэ сыщыт "I am standing",
Сэ сыщылъ "I am lying.",
Сэ сыпхъашӏ "I am a carpenter",
Сэ сытракторист "I am a tractor-driver".

Certain verbs in English with one meaning can have two forms in Adyghe, one static and the other dynamic. For instance, the verb тӏысын "to sit down" is a dynamic verb that expresses someone moving into a sitting position, in contrast to щысын "to be sitting" which expresses the static of a person sitting.

Ныор пхъэнтӏэкӏум ис "The old-woman is sitting on the chair",
Ныор пхъэнтӏэкӏум мэтӏысы "The old-woman is sitting down on the chair".

Person
Adyghe verbs have different forms to express different persons (ex. "I", "You" and "They"). These forms are, mostly, created with specific prefixes. This is what it looks like in singular:

сэ-тхэ "I write",
о-тхэ "You write",
ма-тхэ "writes";

and in plural:

тэ-тхэ "We write",
шъо-тхэ "You write",
ма-тхэ-х "They write".

Tenses
Adyghe verbs have several forms to express different tenses, here are some of them:

Valency increasing
The following prefixes increase the valency by one, meaning, they introduce another argument (person) in the verb.

Moods
Imperative mood of second person in singular has no additional affixes: штэ "take", кӏо "go", тхы "write"; in plural the affix -шъу is added in front of the verbs: шъу-къакӏу "you (plural) go", шъу-тхы "you (plural) write", шъу-штэ "you (plural) take".

Conditional mood is expressed with suffix -мэ: сы-кӏо-мэ "if I go", сы-чъэ-мэ "if I run", с-шӏэ-мэ "if I do".

Concessive mood is expressed with suffix -ми: сы-кӏо-ми "even if I go", сы-чъэ-ми "even if I run", с-шӏэ-ми "even if I do".

Optative mood is expressed with the complex suffix -гъо-т: у-кӏуа-гъо-т "would you go", п-тхы-гъа-гъо-т "would you write".

Interrogative form is expressed with the affix -а: мад-а? "is he sewing?", макӏу-а? "is he going".

Negative interrogative form is expressed with the affix -ба: ма-кӏо-ба "isn't he is going?", мэ-гыкӏэ-ба "isn't he washing?".

Participle

Present participles in the Circassian language are formed from the appropriate dynamic verbs with the suffix -рэ:

кӏо-рэ-р "one that's walking",
чъэ-рэ-р "one that's running".

Participles can also be created from static verbs. In this case no additional morphological modifications are required. For example: щысыр "sitting", щылъыр "lying". In the past and future tenses participles have no special morphological attributes, in other words, their form is identical to the main form of the verb. The forms of participles in different grammatical cases are equal to the forms of the appropriate verbs. The same is also true for their time-tenses.

Masdar

Masdar (a form of verb close to gerund) in Adyghe is formed by adding the suffix -н (-n):

тхы-н "a write (writing)",
чъэ-н "a run (running)",
штэ-н "a take (taking)",
гущыӏэ-н "a talk (talking)",
дзы-н "a throw (throwing)".

Masdar has grammatical cases:

Absolutive чъэны-р,
Ergative чъэны-м,
Instrumental чъэны-м-кӏэ,
Adverbial чъэн-эу

Masdar also can have different forms for different persons:

сы-чъэн "I will run",
у-чъэн "you will run",
чъэн "he will run".

Negative form
In the Adyghe language negative form of a word is expressed with different morphemes (prefixes, suffixes). In participles, adverbial participles, masdars, imperative, interrogative and other forms of verbs their negative from is expressed with the prefix -мы, which, usually, goes before the root morpheme, that describes the main meaning:

у-мы-тх "you don't write",
у-мы-ӏуат "you don't disclose",
сы-къы-пфэ-мы-щэмэ "if you can't bring me",
у-къа-мы-гъа-кӏомэ "if you aren't forced to come".

In verbs the negative meaning can also be expressed with the suffix -эп/-п, which usually goes after the suffixes of time-tenses. For example:

сы-тэджырэ-п "I am not getting up",
сы-тэ-джыгъэ-п "I have not got up",
сы-тэджыщтэ-п "I will not get up".

Morphology

Adjectives
From the morphological point of view adjectives in the Circassian language are not very different from nouns. In combinations with nouns they lose their grammatical independence. Adjectives form their plural form the same way nouns do, they also use the same affixes to form different grammatical cases (from Absolutive to Adverbial).

Adjectives can be either qualitative or relative.

Adjectives can be in singular or plural form: фыжьы "white" (singular) – фыжь-хэ-р "whites" (plural).

They switch grammatical cases similarly to nouns:

A qualitative adjective as a compliment in a sentence goes after the word it describes: кӏалэ дэгъу "good boy", унэ лъагэ "high house"; a relative adjective goes before it: пхъэ уатэ "wooden hammer", гъучӏ пӏэкӏор "iron bed". In the second case adjectives do not change their form, only the appropriate nous do. For example: in plural – гъучӏ пӏэкӏорхэр "iron beds".

In different grammatical cases:

Combining adjectives with nouns it is possible to produce a great lot of phrases: пшъэшъэ дахэ "beautiful girl", кӏалэ дэгъу "good boy", цӏыф кӏыхьэ "long man", гъогу занкӏэ "straight road", уц шхъуантӏэ "green grass" and so on. These phrases can be easily included into sentences. If a noun has a certain grammatical case, the adjective gets the suffix of the case instead of the noun, for example кӏэлэ кӏуачӏэ-р "the strong boy (abs.) and уатэ псынкӏэ-мкӏэ "using the light hammer (ins.).

Circassian qualitative adjectives also have comparative and superlative forms. For example: нахь фыжь "whiter, more white" (comparative form) and анахь фыжь "whitest, most white",

The Comparative degree is formed by auxiliary word нахь:

Ар ощ нахь лъагэ – he is higher than you, 
Нахь ины хъугъэ – He became bigger [More big became],
Нахь лIэблан охъун фай – You must be braver.

The superlative degrees is formed by auxiliary word анахь (more than all...):

Ар пшъашъэмэ анахь дахэ – She is the most beautiful among the girls, 
Ар зэкӏэмэ анахь лъагэ – It is the highest, 
Зэкӏэми шхын анахь дэгъумкӏэ ыгъэшхагъ – (S)he feeds him with the tastiest meal, 
Ар заужмэ анахь лъэшы – He is the strongest.

Affixes
The following suffixes are added to nouns:

The following suffixes are added to adjectives:

Opinion
To indicate a thought or an opinion of someone, the prefix шӏо~ (ʃʷʼa~) is added to the adjective. This can also be used on nouns but it is very uncommon. For example:
 дахэ "pretty" → шӏодах "it's pretty for him.
 дэхагъ "as pretty" → шӏодэхагъ "it was pretty for him.
 ӏэшӏу "tasty" → шӏоӏэшӀу "it is tasty for him.
 плъыжьы "red" → шӏоплъыжьы "it is red for him.

Scaliness of an adjective
The suffix ~гъэ (~ʁa) is appended to indicate a measure of a certain adjective. Usually it is used for measurable adjectives like length, height, weight, size, strength and speed but it can be used on any adjective such as good, tasty, beauty, etc. This suffix can be used to scale adjectives, for instance, the word ӏэшӏу-гъэ (from the adjective ӏэшӏу "tasty") can be used to express different levels/qualities of tastiness. This suffix turns the adjective to a noun.

кӏыхьэ /t͡ʃʼaħə/ – long → кӏыхьагъэ /t͡ʃʼaħaːʁa/ – length.
ӏэтыгъэ /ʔatəʁa/ – high → ӏэтыгъагъэ /ʔatəʁaːʁa/ – height.
псынкӏэ /psənt͡ʃʼa/ – fast → псынкӏагъэ /psənt͡ʃʼaːʁa/ – speed.
фабэ /faːba/ – hot → фэбагъэ /fabaːʁa/ – heat.
кӏуачӏэ /kʷʼaːt͡ʃʼa/ – strong → кӏочӏагъэ /kʷʼat͡ʃʼaːʁa/ – strength.
ӏужъу /ʔʷəʒʷə/ – wide → ӏужъугъэ /ʔʷəʒʷəʁa/ – width.
дахэ /daːxa/ – beautiful → дэхагъэ /daxaːʁa/ – beauty.
ӏэшӏу /ʔaʃʷʼə/ – tasty → ӏэшӏугъэ /ʔaʃʷʼəʁa/ – level of tastiness.
дэгъу /daʁʷə/ – good → дэгъугъэ /daʁʷəʁa/ – level of goodness.

{{fs interlinear|indent=3
|пхъэм иӏужъугъэ 65 сантиметр
|[pχam jəʔʷəʒʷəʁa 65 saːntimetr]
|{the wood.ERG} {its width} 65 centimeters
|"The wood's width is 65 centimeters"}}

State of the adjective
The suffix ~гъакӏэ (~ʁaːt͡ʃʼa) is appended to adjectives to form nouns meaning "the state of being the adjective", in contract to the suffix ~гъэ which is used to measure and scale the adjective. Some examples:

кӏыхьэ /t͡ʃʼaħə/ – long → кӏыхьэгъакӏэ /t͡ʃʼaħəʁaːt͡ʃʼa/ – lengthiness; longness.
псынкӏэ /psənt͡ʃʼa/ – fast → псынкӏэгъакӏэ /psənt͡ʃʼaʁaːt͡ʃʼa/ – speediness.
кӏуачӏэ /kʷʼaːt͡ʃʼa/ – strong → кӏочӏэгъакӏэ /kʷʼat͡ʃʼaʁaːt͡ʃʼa/ – strongness.
дахэ /daːxa/ – pretty → дэхэгъакӏэ /daxaʁaːt͡ʃʼa/ – prettiness.
дэгъу /daʁʷə/ – good → дэгъугъакӏэ /daʁʷəʁaːt͡ʃʼa/ – goodness.

Adverbs
In the Adgyeh language adverbs belong to these groups: adverbs of place, adverbs of time, adverbs of quality and adverbs of amount.

Adverbs of place
 адэ – "there" (invisible).
 модэ – "there" (visible).
 мыдэ – "here".

Adverbs of time
 непэ – "today".
 непенэу – "all day long".
 тыгъуасэ – "yesterday".
 тыгъуасэнахьыпэ – "day before yesterday".
 неущы – "tomorrow".
 неущмыкӏэ – "the day after tomorrow".
 гъэрекӏо – "last year".
 мыгъэ – "this year".
 къакӏорэгъэ – "next year".
 джы – "now".
 джырэкӏэ – "for now".
 джыкӏэ – "so far".
 жыри – "again"
 джыри – "still"
 джыдэдэм – "right now".
 джынэс – "until now".
 пчэдыжьым – "at morning".
 щэджагъом – "at noon".
 щэджэгъоужым – "at afternoon".
 пчыхьэм – "at evening".
 чэщым – "in the night".
 зэманым – "in the past".
 тӏэкӏушӏэмэ (тӏэкӏу машӏэмэ) – "soon".
 бэшӏэмэ (бэ машӏэмэ) – "later".
 тӏэкӏушӏагъэу – "recently".
 бэшӏагъэу – "long time ago".
 пэтырэу – "while".
 етӏанэ (етӏуанэ) – "afterwards"
 пасэу – "early"
 кӏасэу – "lately"
 ренэу – "always"

Adverbs of amount
 макӏэ – "few".
 тӏэкӏу – "a bit".
 тӏэкӏурэ – "few times, for a short period of time".
 бэ "a lot".
 бэрэ "a lot of times, for a long period of time".
 ӏаджэ "many".
 хъои "plenty".
 апӏэ "load of".
 заулэ "several".
 сыдэу "so".

Adverbs of quality
Adverbs of this group are formed from the appropriate qualitative adjectives using the suffix ~эу /~aw/. Adverbs in this group describe the manner in which the verb was done.

 къабзэ "clean" → къабзэу "cleanly"
 чыжьэ "far" → чыжьэу "far",
 псынкӏэ "quick" → псынкӏэу "quickly",
 дахэ "beautiful" → дахэу "beautifully",
 благъэ "near" → благъэу "nearly".
 лъэш "powerful" → лъэшэу "powerfully".
 шъабэ "soft" → шъабэу "softly"
 пытэ "firm" → пытэу "firmly"

Formation of adverbs
Adverbs can be produced different ways and from different parts of speech. The most productive ways to form adverbs are:

suffixing (adding ~эу to adjectives):

дахэ́-у "beautifully" (from дахэ́ "beautiful"),
шъабэ́-у "softly" (from шъабэ́ "soft"),
пытэ́-у "firmly" (from пытэ́ "firm"); 

concatenating:

неущпчэдыжьы́ "tomorrow morning" (неущы́ "tomorrow" + пчэдыжьы́ "morning"),
щэджэгъоужы́м "after dinner" (щэджа́гъу "dinner time" + уж "after");

rethinking or transfer of some forms of words of different parts of speech into adverbs:

пчыхьэ́м "nights" (пчыхьэ́м "evening", ergative case),
лӏыгъэкӏэ "forcibly" (лӏыгъэкӏэ "by courage", instrumental case).

In a sentence adverbs play role of adverbials:

Сэ дэгъоу сэ́джэ "I study well";
Лэжьакӏохэр пчэдыжьым жьэ́у къэтэджых "Workers get up early at morning" and so on.

Contradiction
Adyghe has the word нахь /naːħ/ "rather, actually" which can be used to introduce a clarification or a contradiction in a sentence, for instance, the speaker would use this word when clarifying his statement in contract to the listener's belief. Some examples:

кӏуагъэ "(s)he went" → кӏуагъэ нахь "rather (s)he went".
къины "hard" → къины нахь "rather it is hard".
кӏалэ "boy" → кӏалэ нахь "rather it is a boy".

Unions
In English the word "and" is used to connect parts of speech with others, while in Circassian, there are different ways to connect different parts of speech with others.

 
The conjunctions ыкӏи /ət͡ʃəj/ "and" can also be used to connect different parts of speech.

Verbs: Кӏалэр еджэ ыкӏи матхэ "The boy reads and writes".
Adjectives: Кӏалэр дахэ ыкӏи кӏыхьэ "The boy is handsome and tall".

Conjunctions
Conjunctions in the Circassian language play the same role like in English, they are used to connect together, in different ways, words or parts of a difficult sentence. According to structure of Circassian conjunctions they can be separated into two groups: simple and complex.

Simple conjunctions
Among simple Circassian conjunctions are:

 ыкӏи – "and".
 е – "or".
 ау – "but".

Complex conjunctions
 ау щытми – "however".
 ары шъхьай – "but".
 ащ шъхьакӏэ – "however".
 ары пакӏопышъ – "not only", "but".
 арти – "so".
 армэ (ащтэумэ) – "if so".
 арми (ащтэуми) – "even if so".
 армырмэ – "if not, else, otherwise".
 армырми – "even if not, either way".
 нахь мышӏэми – "despite".
 зэ-зэ – "here-and-there".
 е-е – "either-or".
 сыда пӏомэ – "because".
 ащ къыхэкӏыкӏэ – "due to".
 сыдигъокӏи – "in any case".
 сыдми – "either way".

Particles
In the Circassian language participles are different both by their semantics and structure. Semantically they fall into the following groups: affirmative, negative, interrogative, intensive, indicatory and stimulating.

Affirmative
 ары "yes".
 хъун, хъущт "fine, OK". 
 адэ "of course (expresses confidence)".

For example:

– Непэ тадэжь къакӏоба. – Хъун. "- Come to us today. – OK";
– Къэсӏуагъэр къыбгурыӏуагъа? – Ары. "- Have you understood what I have said? –  Yes";
Адэ, непэ тыдэкӏыни тыкъэшхэщт. "Certainly, we will go out today and eat."

Negative
 хьау "no".

For example: Хьау, хьау, зыми сэ сыфаеп "No, no, I don't want a thing";

Interrogative
 шӏуа "perhaps".

For example: Сыдигъо шӏуа автобусыр къызыкӏощтыр? "When perhaps will the bus come?";

Intensive
 адэ "well".
 кӏо "well".

For example:

Адэ, Пщымаф, гущыӏэу птыгъэр пгъэцэкӏэжьын фай. "Well, Pshimaf, you must keep your word".
Кӏо, кӏалэр еджэн фаи къытдэкӏышъугъэп. "Well, because the boy needs to study he couldn't come out with us.

Indicatory
 мары "this is it",
 моры "that is it".

For example: Мары машинэу зигугъу къыпфэсшӏыгъагъэр "This is the car which I have told you about";

Stimulating
 еу "come on".

For example: Еу, псынкӏэу зегъахь! "Come on, get out of here quickly".

Others
 ашъыу "er", "uh", "I mean" (said when one has made a mistake in speech, before one corrects it)

For example: Уатэр къэсфэхь, Ашъыу, отычэр къэсфэхь " Bring me the hammer, er, I mean, bring me the ax".

 ашъыу "argh", "ugh" (an expression of bad mood or vexation or dissatisfaction) 

For example: Ашъыу!, зэ щыгъэт "Ugh!, shut up for a moment".

 хъугъэ "that's enough" (an expression of giving up) 

For example: Хъугъэ!, некӏо тыкӏожьыщт "That's enough, let's return".

 еоой "alas"

For example: еоой, идж сыд цӏыфым ышӏэжьыщтэр? "Alas, what will the person do now?".

Demonstratives
Adyghe has four demonstratives: а /ʔaː/, джэ /d͡ʒa/, мо /mo/ and мы /mə/.

а /ʔaː/
 that
  — that table
  — that girl
  — that boy is saying
 The determiner  /ʔaː/ refer to a referent that is far away and invisible to both the speaker and the listener(s). It is similar to the English language determiner that, but with the condition that the referent has to be invisible or far away.

мо /maw/
 that
  — that table
  — that girl
  — that boy is saying
 The determiner  refer to a referent that is visible and in a known distance from both the speaker and the listener(s) (both the speaker and the listener(s) can see the referent). It is similar to the English language determiner that, but with the condition that the referent has to be visible.

мы /mə/
 this
  — this table
  — this girl
  — this boy is saying
  — this year
 The determiner  refer to a referent that is close to both the speaker and the listener(s). It is exactly like the English language determiner this.

джэ /d͡ʒa/
 that
  — that table
  — that girl
  — that boy is saying
 The intensive determiner  refer to a referent which is usually invisible. This determiner is used when the referent in the conversation is clear to both the speaker and the listener(s). Someone would use this determiner in order to emphasizes that both he and the listener(s) have the same referent in mind.

тэ (ta)
 which
  — which table?
  — which girl?
  — which boy is saying?

Conjugation
The demonstratives can be used to express different things like:Location: адэ "there", модэ "there", мыдэ "here" and тэдэ "where?".Area: ау "there", моу "there", мыу "here", джэу "there" and тэу "where?".Similarity: ащфэд "like that", мощфэд "like", мыщфэд "like this" and тэщфэд "like what?".Action: ащтэу "like that", мощтэу "like", мыщтэу "like this", джэщтэу "like that" and тэщтэу "how?".Time: ащыгъум "at that moment", мыщыгъум "at this moment" and тэщыгъум "at what time?".Indicatory: ары "that one", моры "that one", мары "thus one", джэры "that one" and тэры "which one?".

Postpositions
In the Circassian language, as well as in other Ibero-Caucasian languages, role of prepositions belongs to postpositions. It is difficult to define the exact count of postpositions in the Circassian language, because even such major parts of speech as nouns (from the point of view of their functionality) sometimes can be included into the group, together with some verb prefixes. For example, in the sentence Тхылъыр столым телъ "The book is lying on the table" the noun has no preposition, but the meaning remains clear because in the verb те-лъ "is lying" the prefix те- expresses something's being on a surface, so this form of the verb literally means "on the surface is lying".

Nouns and adverbs sometimes play role of postpositions. For example, nous that describe different parts of human body (head, nose, side and so on) sometimes function as postpositions. For example: Шъузыр лӏым ыпэ итэу кӏощтыгъэ "The wife was going in front of the husband" (the preposition "in front of" in the Circassian sentence is expressed by the phrase ыпэ итэу "being in front of his nose").

Nouns and pronouns combine with a postposition in the ergative grammatical case only. For example, the postposition дэжь "near, beside" requires a word in the ergative case:

 чъыгы-м дэжь "near the tree";
 ныбджэгъу-м пае "for the friend".

Postpositions can attach possessive prefixes to themselves. For example, in singular:

 сэ с-а-дэжь "near me",
 о у-а-дэжь "near you",
 ащ ы-дэжь "near him";

in plural:

 тэ т-а-дэжь "near us",
 шъо шъу-а-дэжь "near you",
 ахэмэ а-дэжь "near them".

The following words are used as postpositions in the Circassian language:

 дэжь "near".
 пае "for".
 пашъхьэ "in front of, before".
 чӏэгъ "under".
 шъхьагъ "above".
 фэдэу "like, similar".
 азыфагу "between".
 гузэгу "middle".
 бгъу "side".
 гупэ "face".
 кӏыб "back".
 къогъу "corner".
 кӏыӏу "surface".
 кӏоцӏы "inside".
 пэ "nose".
 пшъэ "neck".
 ужы "trace".
 нэуж "track".
 чӏыпӏэ "place".

Interrogatives
The suffix ~a /aː/ initials the interrogative particle that indicates a yes-or-no question. For example:

макӏо "(s)he is going" → макӏуа? "is (s)he going?"
кӏалэ "boy" → кӏала? "is it a boy?"
дахэ "beautiful" → даха? "is (s)he beautiful?"

Кӏала ӏаным тесыр? – Is it a boy that sits on the table?
Кӏалэр ӏаным теса? – Is the boy sits on the table?
Кӏалэр ӏана зытесыр? – Is it a table the boy is sits on?

If question is posited to word having the negative suffix ~п (~p), it is converted to suffix ~ба (~baː). The suffix ~ба /baː/ initials the negative interrogative particle. For example:

макӏо "(s)he is going" → макӏо-ба? "isn't (s)he is going?"
кӏалэ "boy" → кӏалэ-ба? "isn't it is a boy?"
дахэ "beautiful" → дахэ-ба? "isn't (s)he is beautiful?"

Кӏалэба ӏаным тесыр? – Isn't it a boy that sits on the table?
Кӏалэр ӏаным тесыба? – Isn't the boy sits on the table?
Кӏалэр ӏанэба зытесыр? – Isn't it a table the boy is sits on?

If question is posited by auxiliary interrogative words:

 хэт (хэта) "who".
 сыд (шъыд) "what/which".
 сыда (шъыда) "why".
 тыдэ "where".
 тхьэпш "how much".
 сыд фэдиз "how much".
 тэщтэу (сыдэущтэу) "how".
 тары "which".
 сыдигъу (шъыдгъо) "when".
 сыдкӏэ (шъыдкӏэ) "with what".
 сыд фэд? "what kind of?".

Syntax
Order of words in a Circassian sentence is, generally, free, but the situation where verb goes at the end  is the most typical.

Трактористыр пасэу къэтэджыгъ "The tractor-driver got up early".

Structure of a full sentence is, usually, defined by its form of verb. In the Circassian language there are the following types of sentences:

 Nominative sentence, where subject is in the absolutive grammatical case, verb is intransitive, and there is no direct object:
 Гъатхэ́р къэсыгъ, чъыгхэр къызэӏуихыхэу ригъэжъагъ "Spring has come, the trees have started to bloom";
 Ergative sentence, where subject is in ergative case, direct object is in absolutive case, and the verb is transitive:
 Агрономым губгъохэ́р къыплъахьыгъэх "The agronomist has reviewed the fields";
 Sentence, where subject is in zero form. In this type of sentences both transitive and intransitive verbs can be used:
 Нанэ тхъу къыситыгъ "Mother gave me some butter";
 Кӏэлэ тэрэз ащ фэдэу псэурэ́п "A good guy does not behave like that".

This type of Circassian sentences is rarer than the first two. In the Circassian language there are compound sentences that can consist both of  independent parts only, and of the main part in combination with dependent subparts.

Compound sentences with independent parts:

Нэф къэшъыгъ, ау цӏыфхэр джыри урамхэм къатехьагъэхэ́п "The morning has already come, but the people have not appeared on the streets yet";
Зэкӏэ́ къалэ́м къикӏыжьыгъэх, ау ежь Ибрахьимэ ӏофхэр иӏэу къэуцугъ "Everybody has returned from the city, but Ibrahim has stayed because of his affairs."

Compound sentences with dependent parts are structurally different. The most typical Circassian compound sentence with a dependent part is the sentence where its dependent part expresses some sort of circumstances explaining the main part:

Мэзэ́ псау́м ащ ӏоф ышӏагъэ́п, сыда пӏомэ дэсыгъэпы́шъ ары́ "He has not worked for the whole month, because he has been away".

Numbers
Numbers from zero to ten are specific words0 зиӀ 1 зы 2 тӀу 3 щы 4 плӀы 5 тфы 6 хы 7 блы  or 8 и 9 бгъу 10 пшӀы 
Numbers from eleven to nineteen are built with the word for ten, followed by кIу and the unit digit:11 пшӀыкӀуз 12 пшӀыкӀутIу 13 пшӀыкӀущ 14 пшӀыкӀуплI 15 пшӀыкӀутф 16 пшӀыкӀух 17 пшӀыкӀубл 18 пшӀыкӀуй 19 пшӀыкӀубгъу 
The tens follow a vigesimal system from forty up, with the exception of fifty:20 тӀокӀы  (20)21 тӀокӀырэ зырэ  (20 and 1)22 тӀокӀырэ тIурэ  (20 and 2)23 тӀокӀырэ щырэ  (20 and 3)
...30 щэкӀы  (30)31 щэкӀырэ зырэ  (30 and 1)32 щэкӀырэ тIурэ  (30 and 2)
...40 тӀокӀитIу  (20 × 2)41 тӀокӀитIурэ зырэ  (20 × 2 and 1)42 тӀокӀитIурэ тIурэ  (20 × 2 and 2)
...50 шъэныкъо  (half-hundred)51 шъэныкъорэ зырэ  (half-hundred and 1)52 шъэныкъорэ тIурэ  (half-hundred and 2)
...60 тӀокӀищ  (20 × 3)61 тӀокӀищырэ зырэ  (20 × 3 and 1)62 тӀокӀищырэ тIурэ  (20 × 3 and 2)
...70 тӀокӀищырэ пшIырэ  (20 × 3 and 10)71 тӀокӀищырэ пшIыкIузырэ  (20 × 3 and 11)72 тӀокӀищырэ пшӀыкӀутIурэ  (20 × 3 and 12)
...80 тӀокӀиплӀ  (20 × 4)81 тӀокӀиплӀырэ зырэ  (20 × 4 and 1)82 тӀокӀиплӀырэ тIурэ  (20 × 4 and 2)
...90 тӀокӀиплӀырэ пшIырэ  (20 × 4 and 10)91 тӀокӀиплӀырэ пшIыкIузырэ  (20 × 4 and 11)91 тӀокӀиплӀырэ пшӀыкӀутIурэ  (20 × 4 and 12)
One hundred is шъэ (ʂa). The hundreds are formed by the hundred word root (шъ (ʂ)) followed by -и- (-i-) and the multiplier digit root.100 шъэ (ʂa)101 шъэрэ зырэ (ʂara zəra) (100 and 1)110 шъэрэ пшӏырэ (ʂara pʃʼəra) (100 and 10)200 шъитӀу (ʂitʷʼ) (100 × 2)201 шъитӀурэ зырэ  (ʂitʷʼəra zəra) (200 × 2 and 1)300 шъищ (ʂiɕ) (100 × 3)400 шъиплӀ (ʂipɬʼ) (100 × 4)500 шъитф (ʂitf) (100 × 5)600 шъих (ʂix) (100 × 6)700 шъибл (ʂibl) (100 × 7)800 шъий (ʂij) (100 × 8)900 шъибгъу (ʂibʁʷ) (100 × 9)
One thousand is мин (min). The thousands are formed by the thousand word root (мин (məjn)) followed by -и- (-i-) and the multiplier digit root.1000 мин (min)1001 минрэ зырэ (minra zəra) (1000 and 1)1010 минрэ пшӏырэ (minra pʃʼəra) (1000 and 10)1100 минрэ шъэрэ (minra ʂara) (1000 and 100)2000 минитӀу (minitʷʼ) (1000 × 2)3000 минищ (miniɕ) (1000 × 3)4000 миниплӀ (minipɬʼ) (1000 × 4)5000 минитф (minitf) (1000 × 5)6000 миних (minix) (1000 × 6)7000 минибл (minibl) (1000 × 7)8000 миний (minij) (1000 × 8)9000 минибгъу (minibʁʷ) (1000 × 9)10000 минипшӏ (minipʃʼ) (1000 × 10)11000 минипшӀыкӀуз (minipʃʼəkʷʼəz) (1000 × 11)12000 минипшӀыкӀутIу (minipʃʼəkʷʼətʷʼ) (1000 × 12)20000 минитӀокӀы (minitʷʼat͡ʃə) (1000 × 20)100000 минишъэ (miniʂa) (1000 × 100)200000 минишъитӀу  (miniʂitʷʼ) (1000 × 200)

When composed, the hundred word takes the -рэ (-ra) suffix, as well as the ten and the unit if any (e.g.:

шъэрэ зырэ (ʂara zəra) [101], 
шъэрэ тIурэ (ʂara tʷʼəra) [102], 
шъэрэ пшӀыкӀузырэ (pʃʼəkʷʼətʷʼəra) [111],
шъитӀурэ щэкӀырэ плIырэ (ʂitʷʼəra ɕat͡ʃəra pɬʼəra) [234]).

One thousand is мин (min). The other thousands are formed by concatenating the thousand word with -и- (-i-) and the multiplier digit root:

минитӀу (minitʷʼə) [2,000], 
минищ (miniɕ) [3,000],
минищ шъэ (miniɕ ʂa) [3,100], 
минищ шъитIу (miniɕ ʂitʷʼə) [3,200], 
миниплӀ (minipɬʼ) [4,000],
миниплӀы шъэ (minipɬʼəra ʂa) [4,100], 
минишъиплIтIу (miniʂipɬʼətʷʼ) [4,200], 
минишъиплӀщ (miniʂipɬʼəɕ) [4,300], 
минитфы шъэ (minitfə ʂa) [5,100], 
минишъитфтIу (miniʂitfətʷʼ) [5,200]...

When there is a certain amount of the noun, the noun is followed by -и (-i) and the multiplier digit root.

for example:Зы кӀалэ – One boy (zə t͡ʃaːla), 
КӀалитӀу – two boys (t͡ʃaːlitʷʼ), 
КӀалиплӏ – four boys (t͡ʃaːlipɬʼ), 
КӀалишъэ – 100 boys (t͡ʃaːliʂa), Зы мафэ – one day (zə maːfa),
МафитIу – two days (maːfitʷʼ), 
Мафищы (мафищ) – three days (maːfiɕ).

Ordinal numbers
Except апэрэ/япэрэ – first (aːpara/jaːpara) are formed by prefix я- (jaː-) and suffix – нэрэ (- nara). For example: 
ятIунэрэ – second (jaːtʷʼənara), 
ящынэрэ – third (jaːɕənara), 
яплIынэрэ – fourth (jaːpɬʼənara).first – япэрэ second – ятӀунэрэ third – ящынэрэ fourth – яплӀынэрэ firth – ятфынэрэ sixth – яхынэрэ seventh – яблынэрэ eighth – яинэрэ ninth – ябгъунэрэ tenth – япшӀынэрэ eleventh – япшӀыкӏузынэрэ twelfth – япшӀыкӏутӏунэрэ twenty th – ятӏокӏынэрэ hundredth – яшъэнэрэ 

Япэрэ мафэ – First day (jaːpara maːfa), 
ЯтIонэрэ мафэ – second day (jaːtʷʼənara maːfa),
ЯтIонэрэ цуакъо – second shoe (jaːpara t͡ʃʷaːqʷa), 
Яхэнэрэ классым щегъэжьагъэу тутын сешъо~I have been smoking since the sixth class.

Discrete numbers
Are formed by changing the last vowel ~ы (~ə) of number to ~эрэ (~ara):

о плIэрэ къыосIогъах – I have told you four times already.

Number can also define measure of a share: Numbers "one" and "two" are formed by words псау (psaw) (whole, whole), ренэ (rena) (whole, whole about length of time), ныкъо (nəqʷa) (the half).

Fractional numbers
Fractional numerals are formed from cardinal numerals with the help of the -(а)нэ /aːna/ morpheme:

щы /ɕə/ "three" – щанэ /ɕaːna/ "third", 
плӏы /pɬʼə/ "four" – плӏанэ /pɬʼaːna/ "fourth", 
хы "six" – ханэ /xaːna/ "sixth"  and so on.

In a sentence: Чӏыгоу къытатыгъэм изыщанэ картоф хэдгъэтӏысхьа́гъ "On one third of the allocated land we have planted potatoes", 
Хатэм изыщанэ помидор хэдгъэтIысхагъ- third part of vegetable garden we used for the tomatoes, 
Ахъщэ къыратыгъэм ыпӏланэ чыфэ ритыгъ – The quarter of the money he received, he lent.half (1÷2) – ныкъо one third (1÷3) – щанэ two thirds (2÷3) – щанитӏу  (1÷3 × 2)one fourth (1÷4) – плӀанэ two fourths (2÷4) – плӀанитӏу  (1÷4 × 2)three fourths (3÷4) – плӀанищ  (1÷4 × 3)one fifth (1÷5) – тфанэ one sixth (1÷6) – ханэ one seventh (1÷7) – бланэ one eighth (1÷8) – янэ one ninth (1÷9) – бгъуанэ one tenth (1÷10) – пшӀанэ one eleventh (1÷11) – пшӀыкӏузанэ one twelfth (1÷12) – пшӀыкӏутӏуанэ one twentieth (1÷20) – тӏокӏанэ one hundredth (1÷100) – шъанэ 

Separative numbers
Separative numerals are formed by repetition of the appropriate cardinal numeral with the help of the morpheme -ры /-rə/:

зырыз /zərəz/ "by one", 
тӏурытӏу /tʷʼərətʷʼ/ "by twos", 
щырыщ  /ɕərəɕ/ "by threes",
плӏырыплӏ /pɬʼərəplʼ/ "by fours",
тфырытф /tfərətf/ "by fives" and so on.

In a sentence: Еджакӏохэр экзаменым тӏурытӏоу чӏахьэщтыгъэх "Pupils entered the examination room by twos".

Approximate numbers
Approximate numerals are formed as a combination of three cardinal numerals where the main constructive numeral is, usually, the numeral зы "one". for example

зыхыбл /zəxəbl/ зы-хы-бл "about six or seven", зытӏущ /zətʷʼəɕ/ зы-тӏу-щ "about two or three".

In a sentence: Непэ садэжь нэбгырэ зытIущ къыIухьагъ "About two or three people have approached me today".

References

Bibliography
 Аркадьев, П. М.; Ландер, Ю. А.; Летучий, А. Б.; Сумбатова, Н. Р.; Тестелец, Я. Г. Введение. Основные сведения об адыгейском языке в кн.: "Аспекты полисинтетизма: очерки по грамматике адыгейского языка" под ред.: П. М. Аркадьев, А. Б. Летучий, Н. Р. Сумбатова, Я. Г. Тестелец. Москва: РГГУ, 2009 (Arkadiev, P. M.; Lander, Yu. A.; Letuchiy, A. B.; Sumbatova, N. R.; Testelets, Ya. G.
 Introduction. Basic information about Adyghe language in "Aspects of polysyntheticity: studies on Adyghe grammar" edited by: P. M. Arkadiev, A. B. Letuchiy, N. R. Sumbatova, Ya. G. Testelets. Moscow, RGGU, 2009) (in Russian) 
Ranko Matasović, A Short Grammar of East Circassian (Kabardian): .
Caucasus Studies 1 CIRCASSIAN Clause Structure Mukhadin Kumakhov & Karina Vamling

INS:instrumental case

External links
 Adyghe grammar – Introduction Useful site to learn Adyghe grammar
 Adyghe grammar – Detailed (in Russian''')
 Adyghe grammar – Circassian language lessons online Another site to learn the Adyghe grammar

Northwest Caucasian grammars
Adyghe language